The 2020 Doha Diamond League was the 22nd edition of the annual outdoor track and field meeting in Doha, Qatar. Held on 25 September 2020 at the Qatar Sports Club Stadium, it was the eighth and last leg of the 2020 Diamond League – the highest level international track and field circuit. Despite being the last meet in the series, no Diamond League champions were crowned due to the shortened season, and no points were awarded for event placements.

The meet was originally scheduled to be held at the Qatar Sports Club Stadium on April 17, except for the men's high jump, which would have been held at the Katara Cultural Village amphitheatre on April 16. However, on March 16, it was announced that the meet had been postponed due to the COVID-19 pandemic. In May, a new date of 9 October had been selected making it the twelfth leg of the 2020 Diamond League. In August it was rescheduled for the last time to 25 September, making it the eighth and last meet in the 2020 Diamond League after several other meets were cancelled.

Results
Because of the shortened season, no Diamond League points were awarded for athlete placements, and no Diamond League champions were crowned.

Men

Women

See also
2020 Golden Gala (previous meet in the 2020 Diamond League season)

References

Results
"Wanda Diamond League Doha (QAT) 25th September 2020". Diamond League (2020-09-25). Retrieved 2021-05-05.

External links
Official Doha Diamond League website

Doha Diamond League
Doha Diamond League
Sports competitions in Doha
Doha Diamond League
Doha Diamond League
2020 in athletics (track and field)
Doha Diamond League